A Scrap of Bread (aliases: Daily Bread, Egyptian Arabic: لقمة العيش, translit. Louqmat Al-Aych or Lukmat El Aish) is a 1960 Egyptian film starring Salah Zulfikar and directed by Niazi Mustafa.

Plot 
The two friends, Mohsen and Fathi, live together in a hotel, and they both do not work. Mohsen falls in love with Samia and shares the same feelings. Mohsen finally finds a job opportunity at Samia's father's farm, but the only condition for this job is that the employee must be married. Mohsen is forced to lie in order to get the job, so Fathi wears women clothes and goes with Mohsen to the farm as Mohsen's wife, and events escalate.

Staff 

 Directed by: Niazi Mostafa
 Story and script: Niazi Mostafa, Abdel Fattah El-Sayed, Mostafa Fouad
 Cinematographer: Mostafa Hassan
 Editing: Galal Mustafa
 Production: New World Films (Mustafa Hassan)
 Distributor: Abdul Rahim Yazdi
 Editor: Abdul Rahim Yazdi

Cast 

 Salah Zulfikar as Mohsen
 Maha Sabry as Samiya
 Adel Khairy as Fathi
 Zuzu Madi as Mounira
 Hassan Fayek Samia's father
 Saeed Abu Bakr as Bassiouni
 Abdul-Alim Khattab as Ghazal
 Badr Nofal as Owais
 Salwa Mahmoud as Mabrooka
 Kawthar Ramzy as Kawthar
 Abbas Rahmi as Doctor
 Huda Tawfik as Farm woman
 Ragaa Abdel Hamid as Farm woman
 Hussein Ismail as Waiter

See also 
 Salah Zulfikar filmography
 List of Egyptian films of 1960
 List of Egyptian films of the 1960s

References

External links 

 Lukmet el aish on elCinema
 

1960 films
1960s Arabic-language films
20th-century Egyptian films
Egyptian black-and-white films
Egyptian comedy films
Films shot in Egypt